Glass Mountain, on the Inyo National Forest, is one of the tallest peaks in Mono County, California.

The Glass Mountain Ridge forms the northeast boundary of Long Valley Caldera. It consists of a sequence of lava domes, flows, and welded pyroclastic flows of rhyolite composition that were erupted between 2.1 and 0.8 million years ago.
Obsidian, a naturally occurring volcanic glass, can be found on the mountain.

References

External links
 

Volcanoes of Mono County, California
Mountains of Mono County, California
Inyo National Forest
Mountains of Northern California
North American 3000 m summits